The Robin ATL (Avion Très Léger, "very light aircraft") is a French two-seat light aircraft designed by Avions Robin in the 1980s to meet a need for an economical two-seat aircraft to equip flying clubs. It is a single-engined monoplane with a fixed tricycle undercarriage, conventional control stick, and is, unusually, fitted with a V-tail. Due to the large bubble canopy, visibility is  excellent. Its benign flight characteristics, moderate speeds and low fuel consumption, as well as some unique details, like an engine starter button which can only be pressed when the fuel selector switch is open, made the ATL a good trainer.

Development and design
In the early 1980s, Avions Pierre Robin started design of an ultra-lightweight two-seat light aircraft intended to meet the requirements of French flying clubs for a low-cost light trainer, as existing American training aircraft were becoming increasingly expensive, which was not helped by an unfavourable exchange rate, which resulted in a competition to supply a new light trainer, which could be mass-produced for supply to subsidised French flying clubs. Robin won the competition in 1983 with their ATL design, a single-engined low-winged monoplane with a fixed undercarriage and a V-tail. The ATL's fuselage was of Glass-reinforced plastic construction, with a wooden wing, while the V-tail is a conventional all-metal construction.

The first prototype flew on 17 June 1983, powered by a single 35 kW (47 hp) JPX PAL 1300, a new design of two stroke, three-cylinder radial engine.  However, testing showed that the new engine was prone to vibration, and in order to speed development and certification, the prototype was re-engined with a converted Volkswagen car engine, which formed the basis for production. As the four-cylinder car engine was heavier than the original engine, the aircraft's wings were swept forward to maintain the aircraft's centre of gravity in an acceptable position.

Operational history
First orders, for 30 ATLs were placed by the French National Aviation Federation in November 1983, with initial deliveries starting (under a limited airworthiness approval) in April 1985.  Full French certification followed on 15 January 1986. The ATL was prone to engine problems, however, which forced the recall of early production aircraft for modification, and limited the attractiveness of the aircraft, particularly for export.

One solution to this problem was re-engining with a more reliable engine, and Robin developed a version for the German market powered by a 52.5 kW (70 hp) Limbach. While the Limbach was also a modified VW car engine, crucially, it had dual ignition instead of the single ignition on the JPX-modified engines normally used, this being certified in 1989.  This came too late, however, and production ended in 1991 after the completion of 132 aircraft, of which 10 were powered by the Limbach engine.

Variants
ATL Club
Initial production version, named Bijou in the UK.
ATL Club Model 88
Late production version, with smaller propeller giving greater ground clearance and more fuel.
ATL Club Model 89
Limbach powered version.

Specifications (ATL Club)

See also

References

 "Robin ATL flies with VW". Flight International, 26 November 1983. p. 1418.  
 "Robin re-engines ATL". Flight International, 1 July 1989. p. 20.
Blech, Robin. "The Jewel in Robin's Crown: Flight Test Robin ATL". Flight International, 22 June 1985. pp. 26–30.
Donald, David (ed.).The Encyclopedia of World Aircraft Leicester:Blitz, 1997. .
Taylor, John W R. (ed.). Jane's All the World's Aircraft 1988–89. Coulsdon, Surrey, UK: Jane's Information Group, 1988. .

1980s French civil utility aircraft
ATL
Single-engined tractor aircraft
Low-wing aircraft
V-tail aircraft
Aircraft first flown in 1983